The molecular formula C22H37NO2 (molar mass: 347.53 g/mol, exact mass: 347.2824 u) may refer to:

 Anandamide, also known as N-arachidonoylethanolamine (AEA)
 Virodhamine

Molecular formulas